This is a list of major gas station chains in the Philippines. This includes the "Big Three", which refers to the top three companies in the oil industry: Petron, Shell, and Seaoil. Historically, Caltex was part of this grouping.

Domestic

List of gas station chains ran by companies which are headquartered in the Philippines.
Petron (Makati)
Petro Gazz
Phoenix (Davao City)
Seaoil (Pasig)
Flying V (TWA, Inc.; Quezon City)
Unioil (Pasig)
Clean Fuel (Pasig)
FlexFuel (Taguig)

Foreign

List of gas station chains ran by companies which are headquartered outside the Philippines. This includes foreign companies with locally based subsidiaries.

Caltex (Chevron) (United States)
PTT (Thailand)
Shell (Netherlands)
Total (France)

References

 
Gas stations
Gas station chains